PMRL Stadium is a football stadium in Port Moresby, Papua New Guinea.  It is used mainly for football and hosts the home matches of PRK Hekari United of the Papua New Guinea National Soccer League and OFC Champions League.  The stadium has a seating capacity of 15,000 spectators.

External links
Stadium information

Football venues in Papua New Guinea
Buildings and structures in Port Moresby